K. Lee Manuel (1936–November 5, 2003) was an American fiber artist and painter. She was an important figure in the field of wearable art, also known as "artwear" and "art-to-wear." She is best known for her hand-painted feather collars, clothing, and accessories, including kimono. Her bold graphic and contemporary designs include geometric, abstract, natural, and figurative motifs that evoke archetypal stories and dreamlike qualities.

Born in Loma Linda, California, she studied at the University of California, Los Angeles, and received her bachelor of fine arts from the San Francisco Art Institute. She lived and worked in Santa Cruz, California, and was a member of the Bay Area artist collective, Group Nine. Her work has been exhibited in numerous museums and galleries in the United States and abroad. Her work can be found in the permanent collections of the de Young Museum in San Francisco, the Museum of Arts and Design in New York, and at the Smithsonian American Art Museum, Renwick Gallery.

References

External links 
 Geisha Kimono, 1981. Smithsonian American Art Museum.
 Evening Dress and Tunic. Fine Arts Museums of San Francisco, 
 Necklace, 1977. Los Angeles County Museum of Art.

1936 births
2003 deaths
American artists
People from Loma Linda, California
San Francisco Art Institute alumni
Artists from California
University of California, Los Angeles alumni
People from Santa Cruz, California